Apinayé or Apinajé (otherwise known as Afotigé, Aogé, Apinagé, Otogé, Oupinagee, Pinagé, Pinaré, Uhitische, Utinsche, and Western Timbira) is a Northern Jê language (Jê, Macro-Jê) spoken in Tocantins, Eastern Central Brazil by some 2277 speakers of Apinajé people according to the most recent census taken by SIASI/SESAI in 2014. There are thirteen villages that speak the Apinayé language. The biggest and oldest villages include São José and Mariazinha; and the smaller villages are Cocalinho, Patizal, Buriti Comprido, Palmeiras, Prata, Cocal Grande, Serrinha, Botica, Riachinho, Bonito and Brejão.  It is a subject–object–verb language.
 
Ethnologue considers Apinayé "developing," with a rating of 5 on the Expanded Graded Intergenerational Disruption Scale (EGIDS). It can be hypothesized that language transmission is high, since Apinayé was ranked as a threatened language in the past 10 years, but presently it is no longer at that level.

History
Before the 20th century, there used to be three main Apinayé groups known as the Rõrkojoire, the Cocojoire, and the Krĩjobreire. Each had their own land and political division, which totaled more than half of the current territory. Currently, the three distinct Apinayé groups have been living together, though São José is controlled by the Krĩjobreire, and Mariazinha has Cocojoire leadership. During the first quarter of the nineteenth century the Apinayé had a successful economic growth fueled by extensive cattle farming and the extraction of babaù palm oil which brought an increase in migration. The land rights of the Apinayé have been recognized by the federal government of Brazil in the 1988 Constitution.

Contact
The Apinayé indigenous population has had contacts with the Jesuits, military bands and explorers, which is similar to the experiences of other indigenous groups. Between 1633 and 1658, the Jesuits journeyed up the Tocantins River in order to “[persuade] the Indians to ‘descend’ the river to the villages of Pará”. This ushered in the potential of further encounters. On one of his expeditions, Captain-General D. Luiz Mascarenhas was confronted by “war-like” people, the Apinayé, in 1740. Another confrontation between the Portuguese settlers and the Apinayé occurred in 1774 when Antônio Luiz Tavares Lisboa and his band of explorers were traveling by way of the Tocantins River. These early contacts did not greatly disrupt the lifestyle of the Apinayé people. It was not until the 19th century that the indigenous group would suffer from colonization. This was due to the shrinking of their territory and population reduction in the face of settlement establishment by the Portuguese. Da Matta (1982) believes that the Apinayé were saved from extinction mainly due to the fact that the area they were situated in did not have true economic value.

Conflict
During the initial colonization period, the Apinayé had been recorded as being hostile to European expeditions. This prompted the construction of the military post of Alcobaça in 1780. However, it was soon abandoned due to the successful raids of the Apinayé. This only prompted further fortifications. In 1791 “another military post was founded on the Arapary river” and the same occurred in 1797 with the construction of the post of São João das Duas Barras. Regardless of previous conflicts, the Apinayé participated in the War for Independence of 1823 after sending “250 warriors to join the troops of José Dias de Mattos”. The most recent area of conflict was during the construction of the Trans-Amazon highway in 1985, which was supposed to be built over indigenous land. With the support of Krahô, Xerente, Xavante, and Kayapó warriors, the Apinayé had their lands recognized by the Brazilian state and the route of the highway was altered to avoid passing through this indigenous territory.

First Schools
Schools existed in the area of the Apinayé as early as the early 19th century, however it is unclear if their purpose was for the indigenous group or the general settler population. The first instructional materials for the Apinayé language were organized by the missionaries of the Summer Institute for Linguistics, in this particular case, Missionary Patricia Ham. Governmental support for indigenous schools was established as part of the 1988 Constitution. The current school system of the Apinayé shows that children start to learn in their native language up to the 4th grade, when Portuguese is introduced. The schools are run by the Apinayé community, with some teaching staff that comprises non-indigenous instructors and assistants. These schools further support the hypothesis that transmission rates are high; children are monolingual until they reach an age when they can start learning another language, leading to the majority of the population as being bilingual. It seems like the Apinayé language is still an important part of the culture of the group, and therefore has the ability to continue thriving.

Language family
The Jê family is the largest language family in the Macro-Jê stock. It contains eight languages, some of which have many dialects within them. The languages of this family are concentrated mostly in “the savanna regions of Brazil from the southern parts of the states of Pará and Maranhão south to Santa Catarina and Rio Grande do Sul”. Unfortunately, many other languages in the Macro-Jê stock have become extinct, because their East coast location meant for the first contact with Europeans, which, as written above, was violent and detrimental to many indigenous communities.

Literature
A descriptive grammar of this language exists, written by researcher Christiane Cunha de Oliveira in her dissertation “The Language of the Apinajé People of Central Brazil”. Oliveira provides an extensive description and analysis of the phonology, morphology, and syntax of Apinayé. Other linguists have also contributed to the descriptive grammar of the language, including Callow's 1962 paper discussing word order; Burgess and Ham's phonological analysis including topics like consonant to vowel ratio, tone, and inventories of the different sounds of the language; and Callow's 1962 analysis of nominal categories and Ham et al.’s 1979 analysis of verbal categories.

Pedagogical grammars have been created for use in a bilingual classroom setting, with the intention of teaching both national culture and indigenous culture to young students. Sousa et al.’s “Apinajé Intercultural Bilingual School: For an Education Beyond the Ethnic Frontier” discusses this process in depth, and examines the value of having an Apinayé pedagogical grammar in the classroom. There is an intrinsic link between language and culture, and learning the Apinayé language helps children build a stronger connection with both their indigenous culture and the national culture of Brazil. It also is perhaps part of the reason that this language currently holds the status of “developing” on the EGID scale as mentioned above, as transmission of a language to children of the culture is vital to its survival.

Documentation Projects
In the Acknowledgements section of “The Language of the Apinajé People of Central Brazil”, Oliveira thanks the Fundação Nacional do Índio (FUNAI) for assistance with the documentation needed for the research. Therefore, the Apinayé language has been part of a small documentation project, to provide the research necessary for this dissertation and descriptive grammar. Otherwise, documentation projects for this language are unavailable.

Ethnography
The most recent ethnographic study done on the Apinayé people is from 2017, where the education system is analyzed (Sousa et al.). The most prominent ethnography of the Apinayé language and people is Oliveira's thesis dissertation (2005). This was preceded by Da Matta's work (1982) which explores Apinayé customs and traditions. Curt Niumendajú was a German anthropologist and ethnologist who wrote The Apinayé (1939). The book is based on the social structure of the indigenous group, though it also includes minimal information regarding the linguistic formation of the Apinayé language.

Phonology 

The consonant and vowel inventory follows.

Consonants

Vowels 

Just as in Mebengokre, there are underlying nasal vowels which surface independent of the nasal consonants.

Syllable structure

Onsets 
The onset is optional in Apinayé, but when it exists it may be any consonant from the inventory. C1C2V(C)-type syllables, where C2 is a voiced [+cont] semivowel or liquid are very common. CCC onsets are always or

Codas 
The possible syllable types are identical to what we find in Mebengokre, except for those in which there are -initial complex onsets.

Morphology
Christiane Cunha de Oliveira wrote her PhD dissertation on the language of Apinayé (2005). She covers a wide range of morphological topics, which include lexical categories such as nouns, verbs, and postpositions. In the ‘nouns’ section, Oliveira discusses compound nouns and derived nouns in the Apinayé language. Inflection occurs on verbs, in accordance with person, constituency and nonfiniteness. Postpositions inflect for person, if there is a lack of an overt dependent noun phrase.

Pronouns
In Apinayé, there are personal pronouns for the first, second and third persons; which generally occupy the second position in a main clause. The first person pronoun “includes the hortative and plural inclusive distinctions”; other clitics are used to differentiate number distinctions. Pronouns occur in the realis and the irrealis modes: 

Based on the information available, it can be postulated that these are both subject and object pronominal forms. In pragmatically unmarked use, the pronoun works within a clitic sequence, where the mood marker is in the first position and potentially a tense/aspect clitic that is stressed in the group. Phonological words are part of these sequences of clitics. In this instance, the pronouns do not carry stress; voice alteration is based on plosives occurring in the pronouns. For example: 

In pragmatically marked use, a token of the pronoun precedes the sequence clause initially. Therefore, when the pronoun is stressed, the plosives are voiceless. This applies only to the realis form of pronouns:

Clitics

Realis and Irrealis Modes
Numerous grammatical categories are expressed by positional, phrasal and word clitics. Clitics are used to distinguish between realis and irrealis mood in the language. The marker na is used to denote realis clauses; whereas irrealis clauses are indicated by the marker kɔt. The realis domain includes present, past, and habitual postpositions. The irrealis domain represents future, hypothetical, counterfactual, and conditional postpositions. Examples follow below:

Realis:

Irrealis:

Reduplication
Reduplication is a process that occurs in Apinayé. In terms of verbs, it is generally used to describe concepts, such as colours, onomatopoeic sounds; iterative, repetitive, or progressive events; and events that depict fragmentation (like ‘shatter’). Some examples are listed below:

This strategy reproduces the first foot right-to-left of the original stem. The majority of closed syllables lose their coda under these conditions. However that is not always the case. Reduplication does not only occur in verb stems, but also noun stems in some cases; though this occurs when reduplicated verbs convert into nouns, or they are compounds that include reduplicated verbal stems.

Syntax

Valency Change
Some of the syntactic processes of Apinayé are the valency changing operations of causativization. There are two ways of expressing causativization: periphrastic construction and morphological construction.

Periphrastic Causative 
The function of periphrastic construction is encoding indirect causation; the construction ɔ anẽ denotes the clause, while the result is in another clause. Furthermore, the clause which encodes the result functions as a different-subject clause in relation to the clause that expresses causation. For example:

This example shows that the two clauses share an argument; “the object of ɔ anẽ ‘do thus’ is coreferential with the causee”, shown by the independent pronoun at the beginning of the result clause.

The example below will illustrate an alternative situation:

The particle nẽ occurs between the two clauses. The introduction of the conjunction postulates that “the clauses expressing cause and result are not as formally bound to each other” as in the previous example. Both clauses are under the scope of the modality marker, therefore it is a confirmation that they constitute a single sentence. Furthermore, this example differs with the previous ones due to causation; while the causers are animate beings for both examples, the second case shows that the causer is unaware of its actions, whereas the previous example has intentional causes.

The third syntactic pattern is the following:

The inclusion of the modality marker na in the second clause “suggests that cause and result are expressed by two independent sentences”. However, the consultant of Oliveira noted that such constructions are odd, possibly because the higher agent is an event rather than a participant, and are only found in elicitation situations.

Morphological Causative

The morphological causative is distinguished by the marker ɔ, which is preposed to the lexical verb of a clause.  The marker is not a prefix to the verb, and may be labeled as a compound, since no other elements can exist between the two morphemes.  This causativization applies only to monovalent verbs.  For example:

The morphological causative focuses on the effect of the cause in the causal chain. Here, the causee “is affected by the agent/causer; thus, the causee is expressed simply as the patient argument of the verb derived with the causative morpheme ɔ”.  Furthermore, “the lexical verb shares an argument with ɔ and that the latter has a very generic meaning makes it easier for ɔ to become reinterpreted as belonging to a distinct category − a derivational morpheme, in the case at hand − than for the lexical verb to be reinterpreted as a manner adverb”.

The establishment of the new function for ɔ as a morphological causative is “effected by the generalization in the usage of the construction”.  The examples below, in which inanimate participants occupy the position of the higher agent, illustrate this:

Semantics

Quantification

Number Clitics

In Apinayé number distinguishes between singular, dual, and plural categories for nouns and verbs. These are expressed by positional clitics: wa (dual) and mɛ (plural) which occur before nouns and verbs. The number clitics occur after the usage of person pronouns:

The plural clitic mɛ can be a noun modifier, the dual clitic wa is not:

The plural and dual markers can also be used in compounding. An example is when they “combine with the indefinite article õ to form the indefinite pronouns mɛʔõ ‘someone’ and waʔõ ‘someone’”.

Quantifiers - Noun Phrases
In Apinayé, the quantifiers wa ‘dual’ and me ‘plural’ are positional clitics as well, and have the same distribution when it comes to person prefixes, as with full nouns; the clitics occur before:

With free pronouns, the clitics occur after:

Quantifiers - Postpositional Phrases
The plural and dual clitics may co-occur with a postposition that is inflected for person. The quantifier clitic is modifying the person prefix attached to the postposition, and occurs in front of it. When it comes to the third person, the majority of postpositions take a zero prefix, though there are some irregular forms. Such examples follow below:

References

External links 
 WALS page for Apinayé

Jê languages
Languages of Brazil
Indigenous languages of South America (Central)
Indigenous languages of South America